José Filipe Torres (born 13 April 1976) is a Portuguese entrepreneur, spokesperson, one of to 3 international experts on country branding and nation branding consultant.

Biography

Studied in Parson, New York City and Central St Martins, London. He is the CEO and Founder of Bloom Consulting, a company he set up in 2003. He was quoted by Forbes about nation branding, cautioning that, "Good brand positioning doesn't always mean more tourism, economic development and foreign investment".

In 2011, Torres initiated a new research project which investigated 144 countries trade performance and 157 countries tourism performance, with analysis on dozens of variables. The report was given the name Bloom Consulting Country Brand Ranking and has been published all around the world including CNN.

References

External links
 Bloom Consulting
 Country Branding Blog

Living people
Portuguese businesspeople
1976 births
Place of birth missing (living people)